Izithunzi is a genus of false violin spiders first described by F. M. Labarque, A. Pérez-González & Charles Edward Griswold in 2018.

Species
 it contains five species:
Izithunzi capense (Simon, 1893) — South Africa
Izithunzi lina Labarque, Pérez-González & Griswold, 2018 — South Africa
Izithunzi productum (Purcell, 1904) — South Africa
Izithunzi silvicola (Purcell, 1904) — South Africa
Izithunzi zondii Labarque, Pérez-González & Griswold, 2018 — South Africa

References

External links

Endemic fauna of South Africa
Araneomorphae genera
Drymusidae